Jhonney Jesús Duarte Yánez (born 7 February 2000) is a Venezuelan footballer who plays as a midfielder for Venezuelan Primera División side Caracas FC.

International career
Duarte made his senior league debut in a 2–1 loss to Aragua F.C., replacing Reiner Castro after 76 minutes.

Career statistics

Club

Notes

References

2000 births
Living people
Venezuelan footballers
Association football midfielders
Caracas FC players
Venezuelan Primera División players
Sportspeople from Valencia, Venezuela
21st-century Venezuelan people